Renzetti is an Italian surname. Notable people with the surname include:

Francesco Renzetti (born 1988), Italian footballer 
Joe Renzetti, American film composer
Rob Renzetti (born 1967), American animator
Nick Renzetti III (born 2001), American musician

See also
6291 Renzetti, a main-belt asteroid 

Italian-language surnames